Tor Air AB, operated as Tor Air, was a charter airline based in Gothenburg, Sweden, that operated between December 2008 and December 2011. Its main base was Gothenburg City Airport. This airline should not be mixed up with another Swedish charter airline named Tor-Air, which operated from 1964 and 1966 with Curtiss Commando and Douglas DC-3 aircraft.

History

The company was established by private investors and received a Swedish Air Operators Certificate on 1 December 2008. It commenced operations in December 2008 with a Boeing 737-400 leased from International Lease Finance Corporation. The airline specialised in wet-lease and charter operations, particularly operating services for other carriers when needed. Tor Air later acquired two Boeing 737-300s to fly from Manchester to Preveza and Gothenburg, as well as London-Gatwick to destinations such as Faro, Skiathos, Bourgas, Sharm el-Sheikh, Zante, Kos, Corfu and Rhodes.

On 25 April 2010, Tor Air's Boeing 737-400 operated the first commercial service between Baghdad and London in 20 years, while on a wet lease to Iraqi Airways. It was a short lived service however as a lawyer for Kuwait tried to have the aircraft seized in London due to financial problems between Iraq and Kuwait, this was not possible though as the aircraft belonged to a Swedish company and not an Iraqi company.

Collapse

On 20 December 2011, Tor Air had its licence revoked by Sweden's transportation board, due to lack of sufficient financial resources. All staff were made redundant.

Destinations
Tor Air operated charter flights, serving the following destinations (as of March 2011):

Fleet
The Tor Air fleet included the following aircraft in September 2011:

References

Bibliography

External links

Defunct airlines of Sweden
Airlines established in 2008
Airlines disestablished in 2011
Charter airlines